Linthia is an extinct genus of echinoids that lived from the Late Cretaceous to the Eocene.  Its remains have been found in Africa, Asia, Europe, and North America.

References

Further reading 
 Fossils (Smithsonian Handbooks) by David Ward (Page 183)

Schizasteridae
Prehistoric echinoid genera
Cretaceous echinoderms
Paleocene echinoderms
Eocene animals
Prehistoric animals of Africa
Prehistoric animals of Asia
Prehistoric animals of Europe
Prehistoric echinoderms of North America
Late Cretaceous first appearances
Eocene genus extinctions